The Representative of Anguilla in London is the diplomatic mission of the British Overseas Territory of Anguilla in the United Kingdom. It was formerly located in the West Wing of Somerset House, and is now on Storey's Gate in Westminster.

References

External links
 Official site

Diplomatic missions in London
Buildings and structures in the City of Westminster
Aldwych
British Overseas Territories–United Kingdom relations